Lyne is a small town with a population of 250 (1 January 2022) in southwest Denmark on the peninsula of Jutland.

See also
 Morten Eskesen

External links
 Official Website

References

Cities and towns in the Central Denmark Region
Ringkøbing-Skjern Municipality